Durai Vaiko (born 1972) is a businessman and son of Vaiko, founder of Marumalarchi Dravida Munnetra Kazhagam (MDMK). He was appointed as the MDMK chief secretary of the party, one of the party's star campaigners and leads the internet wing for MDMK. He also owns V Realty Private Limited, a construction firm. His political career came into intensive reach when Vaiko contested the Lok Sabha election from Virudhunagar constituency in 2014. 
He graduated with an MBA. He was married to Geetha on 29 November 1998.

Philanthropy

COVID-19 medical camp
Durai set up a medical camp in Ezhayirampannai, Alankulam, Sathirpati, Padandhal and Sattur in Virudhunagar District during COVID second Wave.

References

Living people
Tamil Nadu politicians
Marumalarchi Dravida Munnetra Kazhagam politicians
1972 births